Brayton Josué Vázquez Vélez (born 5 March 1998) is a Mexican professional footballer who plays as a centre-back.

International career

Youth
Vázquez was called up for the 2017 FIFA U-20 World Cup.

Vázquez was called up by Jaime Lozano to participate with the under-22 team at the 2019 Toulon Tournament, where Mexico finished in third. He was called up by Lozano again to participate at the 2019 Pan American Games, with Mexico winning the third-place match.

Career statistics

Club

Honours
Atlas
Liga MX: Apertura 2021

Mexico U23
Pan American Bronze Medal: 2019

References

1998 births
Living people
Mexican footballers
Mexico youth international footballers
Association football defenders
Atlas F.C. footballers
Liga MX players
Liga Premier de México players
Tercera División de México players
Footballers from Jalisco
People from Zapopan, Jalisco
Pan American Games medalists in football
Pan American Games bronze medalists for Mexico
Footballers at the 2019 Pan American Games
Mexico under-20 international footballers
Medalists at the 2019 Pan American Games